Peter Knowles (born 28 December 1969) is a former English badminton player. He competed for Great Britain at the 1996 and 2000 Summer Olympics. He also represented England at the 1994 and 1998 Commonwealth Games, winning a mixed team gold in 1994, and a men's team bronze medal in 1998. Knowles who played for Kent badminton won the men's singles title at the National Championships in 1997, and has been capped 39 times for England.

Achievements

IBF World Grand Prix
The World Badminton Grand Prix sanctioned by International Badminton Federation (IBF) since 1983.

Men's singles

IBF International
Men's singles

Men's doubles

References

External links
 
 

1969 births
Living people
Sportspeople from Stockport
English male badminton players
Olympic badminton players of Great Britain
Badminton players at the 2000 Summer Olympics
Badminton players at the 1996 Summer Olympics
Badminton players at the 1998 Commonwealth Games
Badminton players at the 1994 Commonwealth Games
Commonwealth Games medallists in badminton
Commonwealth Games gold medallists for England
Commonwealth Games bronze medallists for England
Medallists at the 1994 Commonwealth Games
Medallists at the 1998 Commonwealth Games